The Women's 100 metres L3 was a sprinting event in athletics at the 1984 Summer Paralympics. It was unusual in that only one athlete took part. Although single athlete races had not been entirely uncommon during the 1960s, they had become very rare by 1984.

As the sole competitor, Twyanna Caldwell of the United States needed only to complete the race in order to win gold. She did so in a time of 21.73s.

References 

Women's 100 metres L3